Secrets of Great British Castles is a British history documentary series produced by Dublin based Sideline Productions in 12 parts. It was first broadcast between 3 April 2015 and 9 December 2016 (6 parts per season). Historian Dan Jones explores the millennium of history behind Great Britain's most famous castles.

Episode list

References

External links
 

2015 British television series debuts
2016 British television series endings
2010s British documentary television series
Channel 5 (British TV channel) original programming
English-language television shows
Television shows set in the United Kingdom